Kylie V is a singer-songwriter based in Vancouver, British Columbia. Born Kylie Van Slyke, they debuted with their EP Lotus Eater in December 2018. Their first full-length album Big Blue was released in February 2021. They have since performed with acts such as Mal Blum, Peach Pit, and Peach Kelli Pop.

Van Slyke began playing guitar at age thirteen, inspired by fellow Vancouver indie rock musicians Peach Pit. They were raised in a musical family, their mother being a singer, father a drummer, maternal grandfather a drummer and drum maker, and paternal grandfather a trumpeter. Van Slyke has also cited artists such as Phoebe Bridgers, Big Thief, Snail Mail, Crywank, Christian Lee Hutson, and Neutral Milk Hotel.

Van Slyke identifies as non-binary and has openly discussed being diagnosed with autism, as well as their struggles with depression and anxiety.

Discography 

 lotus eater EP (2018)
 Big Blue (2021)
 Runaway EP (2023)

References 

Living people
Canadian indie rock musicians
Canadian indie pop musicians
Canadian singer-songwriters
Non-binary musicians
Year of birth missing (living people)